The 2020–21 Georgia Lady Bulldogs basketball team represented the University of Georgia during the 2020–21 NCAA Division I women's basketball season. The Lady Bulldogs, led by sixth-year head coach Joni Taylor, played their home games at the Stegeman Coliseum and competed as members of the Southeastern Conference (SEC). They finished the season 21–7 (10–5 SEC) and earned an at-large bid to the NCAA tournament, where they lost in the second round to Oregon.

Preseason
The SEC media poll was released on November 17, 2020.

Roster

Rankings

^Coaches' Poll did not release a second poll at the same time as the AP.

Schedule

|-
!colspan=9 style=| Non-conference regular season

|-
!colspan=9 style=| SEC regular season

|-
!colspan=9 style=|SEC Tournament

|-
!colspan=9 style=|NCAA tournament

References

Georgia Lady Bulldogs basketball seasons
Georgia
Georgia Lady Bulldogs
Georgia Lady Bulldogs
Georgia